Giora Eiland (born 1952 in moshav Kfar Hess) is Major General (ret.) Israel Defense Forces. Eiland is a former head of the Israeli National Security Council. After his retirement from the public sector, he was a senior research associate at the Institute for National Security Studies (INSS).

Eiland is a frequent commentator and contributor on international security matters on local and foreign media. In 2007 he founded a consulting company of national security and strategic services for governments and multinational organizations. He holds an M.B.A. and B.A. in economics from Bar Ilan University.

Biography

Military service
Eiland joined the army in 1970, and served in the Paratroopers Brigade Battalion 890. He served in a variety of roles within the brigade: as platoon leader (1973 Battle of the Chinese Farm in the Yom Kippur War), an  operations officer, company commander (1976 Operation Entebbe), vice-commander of a battalion (1978 Operation Litani), commander of 50 "Baselet" Airborne Battalion (1982 First Lebanon War) and reserve commander of the  Paratroopers Brigade.

Following First Lebanon War Eiland served as commander of Infantry Officers School of the Chief Officer of Infantry Corps (Israel). In 1984 Eiland  completed the Advanced Infantry Course at Fort Benning, Georgia, United States. After his return to Israel he was appointed as Operations Directorate officer in the Infantry Corps (Israel). In the years 1990–1992 he commanded the IDF Officers School (Training Base 1), and in the years 1992–1993 was the commander of the Givati Brigade.

In 1993, Eiland was appointed as the head of the Paratroopers and Infantry Corps in the rank of Brigadier General. In 1996 Eiland was appointed Head of Operations Division in Operations Directorate, and in 1999 he was appointed Head of Operations Directorate in rank of Major General. In this role he was involved in preparations for the IDF withdrawal from Lebanon and also in conflict with the Palestinians (Second Intifada). In 2001 he was appointed head of the Planning Directorate. Still an army officer, Eiland took part in the political process, during the Israeli–Palestinian peace process and was appointed to accompany the Foreign Minister Shimon Peres, in his talks with Yasser Arafat. Eiland also represented the Israeli security forces in talks with U.S., Palestinian and other officials. In 2003, with the end of his term in the Planning Directorate, Eiland rejected an offer to become IDF attache in Washington, and retired from the army after 33 years of service.

National Security Council
Eiland left the Planning Directorate and the IDF to accept, in January 2004, Sharon's offer that he head the National Security Council (NSC). Eiland was the fourth NSC head in the six years of the Council's existence, the others being David Ivri, Uzi Dayan, and Ephraim Halevy, and could not penetrate the walls around the Prime Minister's office. However, unlike Dayan and Levy, whose terms were marked by worsening relations with Prime Minister Sharon, Eiland had a constructive working relationship with the Prime Minister, despite their practical disagreements.

In early 2003, a few weeks after his retirement from the army and arrival to the NSC, Eiland became aware of  Sharon's disengagement initiative – at that stage the initiative had more limited objectives in the Gaza Strip and broader in the West Bank. Eiland agreed that a political initiative was needed, but objected to both the content of Sharon's proposal and the procedure for preparing and presenting it. In 2004 Eiland took part in drawing up the disengagement plan in close consultations with US Advisors among them National Security Council Middle East Advisor Elliott Abrams. Eiland shuttled with Ariel Sharon's Chief of Staff, between Washington and Jerusalem to hammer up successive drafts. It was Eiland's initiative to establish a Disengagement Authority and to set a realistic schedule program. The plan, as adopted by the Israeli Government and the Knesset, is largely a result of Eiland's formulation. During the year 2005 there were reports in the media about Eiland's criticism of the policy and the national security decision-making process. After the implementation of the disengagement plan had been concluded, Eiland informed the Prime Minister that he had exhausted his ability to influence the process and he decided to resign from the NSC.

Among other tasks during his tenure, Eiland was appointed as the head of the first governmental steering committee on cyber.

On June 1, 2006, he was replaced as head of NSC by former deputy head of the Mossad, Ilan Mizrahi.

After retiring from the Council
In 2006, Eiland was appointed by the Chief of Staff, Dan Halutz, as the head of the examination committee of experts, to investigate the capture of the Israeli soldier Gilad Shalit by the Hamas to Gaza Strip.

In 2010, Eiland headed a team of experts examining the preparations and in the actual boarding of the Gaza flotilla raid. Eiland presented the report to the chief of staff, Gabi Ashkenazi on July 12, 2010.

On May 29, 2011, Eiland said on Kol Yisrael Radio that in his view it would be better for Israel to let the next flotilla – expected to set  out in late June 2011 – get through to Gaza, provided that the Government of Turkey would be willing to take responsibility for the flotilla, inspect all ships and make sure they were not carrying arms.

In 2007, he founded a private consulting company, giving advice to several companies in the defense industry of Israel, as well as to Israel Military Industries. The company also provides services in various settings to foreign governments, multinational corporations, and organizations. Among other projects, Eiland gave an expert's witness and submitted an expert's opinion on security aspects, in the international arbitration in the case of the Egyptian pipeline explosion which halted the flow of gas to Israel due to a series of terrorist explosions in 2011. In 2015 the arbitration ruled in favor of the Israeli prosecutor, telling the Egyptian gas companies to pay a compensation of $1.8 billion.

Eiland regularly writes op-ed articles in Yediot Aharonot. In these he reiterates two specific interlinked ideas. Eiland calls for Israel to recognise Hamas as the effective government of the Gaza Strip and cease any attempt to topple Hamas or facilitate restoration of Palestinian Authority rule in Gaza. And Eiland promotes the idea of "A Regional Solution" for the Palestinian problem, whereby Israel would annex a large part of the West Bank, and Egypt would compensate the Palestinians by ceding to them part of the Sinai Peninsula. As of March 2019, Eiland's ideas were not adopted by Israeli, Palestinian or Egyptian decision-makers; indeed, Palestinians and Egyptians on several occasions vehemently denounced them.

References

1952 births
Israeli people of the Yom Kippur War
Israeli generals
Living people
Bar-Ilan University alumni